Alexandra Hills State High School is an independent coeducational public secondary school located in Alexandra Hills in the local government area of Redland City in Queensland, Australia. The school has a total enrolment of more than 1500 students each year, with an official count of 1568 students in August 2020.

Since 2021, the school's role of Principal has been held by Julie-Ann McCullough. The school also consists of five Deputy Principals, one Business Services Manager, thirteen Heads of Department, six Year Level Coordinators, two Guidance/Indigenous Affairs Officers, two International Student Coordinators, one School Chaplain, one Industry Liaison Officer, one Student Welfare Officer and 64 teaching staff.

Sporting houses

Alexandra Hills State High School includes the following zero sporting houses with their respective colours:

Facilities

Bistro 4161

Alexandra Hills State High School includes a training restaurant known as Bistro 4161, which was named in reference to the postcode of the area the school is located in. The restaurant is operated by Years 11 and 12 students participating in the Certificate II and Certificate III in Hospitality courses. It enables students to receive training in all aspects of hospitality, including service of food and beverages, and operation of POS systems.

Mac Media Lab

The Mac Media Lab is a media laboratory equipped with the latest iMacs for the production of professional and creative multimedia and video content. Through the use of this laboratory, Students in Media classes as well as various other classes have the opportunity to create quality audio and video presentations as part of their assessments.

Computer laboratories

As a Centre of Excellence in Automation and Robotics, Alexandra Hills State High School includes specialised computer laboratories to allow students studying the Technologies subjects of Industrial Technology & Design and IT to learn next generation technology skills in electronics, programming and automation. These laboratories include specialised technology equipment and software, such as a laser cutter and 3D printers.

Extended Experimental Investigation Room

The Extended Experimental Investigation Room is a fully equipped science laboratory that is available to Senior Science students who undertake Extended Experimental Investigation as part of their assessment program in Biology, Chemistry, Physics and Engineering.

Curriculum

English

English is a compulsory core subject across the Year 7–10 curriculum. Students from Years 7–10 have options to study either General English or English Extension. English subjects available to students in Years 11 and 12 include the General subject of English and the Applied subject of Essential English.

Mathematics

Mathematics is a compulsory core subject across the Year 7–10 curriculum. The Mathematics faculty from Years 7–10 consists of the three classes of Core Mathematics, the STEM Academy Extension Class and the Numeracy Support Program. Mathematics subjects available to students in Years 11 and 12 include the General subjects of General Mathematics, Mathematical Methods and Specialist Mathematics, and the Applied subject of Essential Mathematics.

Humanities

Humanities is a compulsory core subject that consists of the classes of History and Geography across the Year 7–9 curriculum. In Year 10, Humanities remains a compulsory subject in which students participate in the semester-long subjects of Ancient History or Modern World History, or the year-long subjects of Geographical Sciences, Introduction to Ancient History, Introduction to Economics and Introduction to Modern History. Humanities subjects available to students in Years 11 and 12 include the General subjects of Ancient History, Economics, Geography and Modern History.

Science

Science is a compulsory core subject across the Year 7–10 curriculum. Invitational Signature Classes from Years 7–10 in the Science faculty include the STEM Academy Class and the Science Extension Class. Science subjects available to students in Years 11 and 12 include the General subjects of Biology, Chemistry, Physics and Psychology, and the Applied subject of Agricultural Practices.

Languages

German, Italian and Japanese are the school-based Languages Other Than English administered at Alexandra Hills State High School, whereas the languages of Chinese, French and Spanish are also available through the Brisbane School of Distance Education. All students in Years 7 and 8 study a language and are elective subjects from Years 9–12.

Health & Physical Education

Health & Physical Education is a compulsory core subject across the Year 7–10 curriculum. Health & Physical Education subjects available to students in Years 11 and 12 include the General subjects of Health Education and Physical Education, and the Applied subject of Sport & Recreation.

Business

Business is studied as an elective subject for one semester in Year 8, whereas from the beginning of Year 9, Business is studied as an 18-month-long course. In the second semester of Year 10, students have opportunities to participate in the elective subjects of Accounting, Business, Business Studies, Legal Studies, Pre-Certificate III in Business, Social & Community Studies and Tourism. Business subjects available to students in Years 11 and 12 include the General subjects of Accounting, Business and Legal Studies, and the Applied subjects of Business Studies, Social & Community Studies and Tourism.

Design Technologies

In Year 8, students study the elective subjects of Design Technologies and Furnishings for one semester. From the beginning of Year 9, students study these two subjects for 18 months. In the second semester of Year 10, students have opportunities to participate in the subjects of Design, Furnishing Skills and Engineering Skills. Design Technologies subjects available to students in Years 11 and 12 include the General subject of Design and the Applied subjects of Engineering Skills, Furnishing Skills, Industrial Graphics Skills and Introduction to Industrial Technology Skills – Automotive.

Digital Technologies

In Year 8, students study the elective subject of Digital Technologies for one semester. From the beginning of Year 9, the subject is studied for 18 months. In the second semester of Year 10, students have opportunities to participate in the subjects of Digital Solutions, Information & Communication Technology and Introduction to Remote Pilot License.

Performing Arts

Students in Years 7 and 8 undertake the Performing Arts classes of Dance, Drama and Music over the two-year period. In Years 9 and 10, these subjects are studied as elective subjects. Performing Arts subjects available to students in Years 11 and 12 include the General subjects of Dance, Drama and Music, as well as the Year 12 subject of Music Extension.

Practical Arts

Year 7 students study Home Economics for one term and in Year 8, students study the semester-long subjects of Catering and Fashion. From the beginning of Year 9, the two subjects studied in Year 8 are studied as 18-month-long elective subjects. In the second semester of Year 10, students have opportunities to study the subjects of Introduction to Early Childhood Education, Introduction to Fashion, Introduction to Food & Nutrition and Introduction to Hospitality. Practical Arts subjects available to students in Years 11 and 12 include the General Subject of Food & Nutrition and the Applied subjects of Fashion and Hospitality Practices.

Visual Arts

Year 7 students study the subjects of Visual Art and Media for one term. In Year 8, these two subjects are studied as elective subjects for one semester. From the beginning of Year 9, these subjects are studied as 18-month-long courses. In the second semester of Year 10, students have opportunities to participate in the subjects of Fast Track Art, Fast Track Visual Arts in Practice, Fast Track Media and Fast Track Film, Television & New Media. Visual Arts subjects available to students in Years 11 and 12 include the General subjects of Visual Art and Film, Television and New Media, and the Applied subjects of Media Arts in Practice and Visual Arts in Practice.

Specialist programs

Rugby League Development Program

The Rugby League Development Program is a specialist program for students in all year levels that enables them to advance skills, improve fitness and gain knowledge of the game of Rugby League.

Sports Academy

The Sports Academy program is a specialist program for students from Years 7 to 10. The aim of the program is to develop the performance and skills required across a broad range of sports, while linking these elements to the theoretical knowledge needed by an athlete.

Honours Academy

The Honours Academy Program consists of the highest-performing academic students in Years 11 and 12, twenty students from each year level. Each student is paired with a teacher who will be an individual mentor to the student for the two years of senior school. The mentor (teacher) guides students to manage their learning independently through monitoring their performance and assisting them to gain greater insight into themselves as learners. Studies indicate that formal youth mentoring programs can promote positive outcomes, such as improved self-esteem, social skills and career development.

STEM Academy Program

The STEM (Science, Technology, Engineering and Mathetmatics) Academy Program is a specialist program for high-achieving students from Years 7 to 10. Students in the program benefit from increased access to resources from the Centre of Excellence in Automation and Robotics.

Vocational Education & Training

Alexandra Hills State High School offers the following Vocational Education & Training (VET) subjects to students in Years 11 and 12:

 Certificate II in Sport & Recreation (NRL Specialty) Rugby League (SIS20115)
 Certificate III in Aviation (Remote Pilot - Visual Line of Sight) (AVI30316)
 Certificate III in Business (BSB30115)
 Certificate III in Early Childhood Education & Care (CHC30113)
 Certificate III in Fitness (SIS30310)

Extracurricular clubs and activities

Academic
 After School Literacy
 HHQ (Homework Headquarters)
 Language Tutoring and Culture Club
 Maths Tutoring
Arts
 Art Club
 Choir
 Drama Extension
 Drumline
 Guitar
 Instrumental Music
 Music Club
 Piano
Competitive
 Armonia
 Dance Troupe
 Debating
Event Support
 Film Crew
 Tech Crew
Personal Achievement
 Duke of Edinburgh Award
Promotional
 Alexandra Hills State High School Yearbook/Magazine
Recreational
 Afternoon Hangs
 Book Club
 Card Club
 Chess Club
 History Club
 Nintendo Club
 Photography Club
 Robotics Club
 Science Club
 Tabletop Gaming Club
Sports
 Aerobics
 School Gym
 Student & Teacher Competitions
Welfare/Goodwill
 Chill Zone
 Interact Club
 Leo Club
 Student Council
 Taskforce Buddy Bench

Notable alumni
 Kathryn Beck, actress
 Reece Hoffman, Wests Tigers player
 Tarni White, St. Kilda AFLW Player

References

External links
 

Public high schools in Queensland
Schools in South East Queensland
Educational institutions established in 1987
1987 establishments in Australia